Gheorghe "George" Copos (born 27 March 1953, in Tășnad, Satu Mare County) is a Romanian businessman and politician.

A graduate of the communist cadres' training school Ștefan Gheorghiu Academy, he was in his youth a leader of the Union of Communist Youth.

He is the owner of a chain of confectionery shops, a chain of electronics shops, several hotels. He owned the football club Rapid București between 1992 and 2013.

Copos was a member of the Conservative Party and between December 2004 and January 2006, he was a vice-prime-minister and State Minister in charge with coordination of the activities in the field of business environment and small and medium-sized enterprises in the Tăriceanu government.

On January 21, 2006, he resigned from the Conservative Party amid a corruption scandal. He maintained, however, his function as vice prime-minister and State Minister in the government. He also resigned from the government in June 2006, maintaining his function as a senator.

On March 4, 2014, a Romanian appeals court sentenced him to 3 years and 8 months in prison for fraud, tax evasion and money laundering in connection with Rapid Bucharest football player transfers; he was also ordered to repay the equivalent of US$690,000 to the football club and the Romanian state.

On the 26th of March 2014, a Romanian court sentenced him to 4 years in prison for fraud, in a case regarding the sale of several commercial venues to the Romanian State Lottery.

See also 
 List of corruption scandals in Romania

References

External links
 Gheorghe Copos' blog 

1953 births
Living people
Romanian football chairmen and investors
FC Rapid București presidents
Romanian businesspeople
Conservative Party (Romania) politicians
People from Tășnad
Romanian politicians convicted of crimes
Romanian white-collar criminals
Politicians convicted of fraud